Tommy Conroy (born  1963) is a former Gaelic footballer who played for the Dublin county team. He played a key role in Dublin's victory against Galway in the 1983 All-Ireland Senior Football Championship Final. Top Cat won an All Star in 1985 after a particularly noteworthy season for both his club, St Vincents, and for Dublin. He was part of the backroom staff for St Vincent's 2008 All-Ireland Club Championship-winning team and was the manager of the St Vincent's team that won the 2013 All-Ireland Club championship.

References

External links
Article on the Summer of '83

1960s births
Living people
All-Ireland Senior Club Football Championship winning managers
Dublin inter-county Gaelic footballers
Gaelic football forwards
Gaelic football managers
Winners of one All-Ireland medal (Gaelic football)
People educated at St. Joseph's CBS, Fairview